Edward William Wynne Pendarves (6 April 1775 – 26 June 1853) was an English politician.

Born Edward William Stackhouse, he was son of John Stackhouse and his wife Susanna Acton. He served as Member of Parliament (MP) for West Cornwall from the creation of the Constituency on 19 December 1832 until the year of his death.

He was on the Committee of Management of the South Western Railway in 1836. He was one of the proprietors of the University of London, who requisitioned a special general meeting in 1831, to appoint a Select Committee to investigate the lack of progress with the project. He was appointed Deputy-Warden of the Stannaries in 1852.

His memorial is in St Martin and St Meriadoc’s Church, Camborne designed by Edward Hodges Baily.

References

External links
 West Briton obituary, Friday 1 July 1853.

1775 births
1853 deaths
Politicians from Cornwall
Members of the Parliament of the United Kingdom for constituencies in Cornwall
Fellows of the Royal Society
UK MPs 1832–1835
UK MPs 1835–1837
UK MPs 1837–1841
UK MPs 1841–1847
UK MPs 1847–1852
UK MPs 1852–1857